State Road 82 (SR 82) is a 29-mile-long east–west highway serving northern Lee and Collier County, Florida (and "clipping" the southwest corner of Hendry County).  The western terminus is an intersection with Cleveland Avenue (US 41-SR 45, part of the Tamiami Trail) in Fort Myers; the eastern terminus is an intersection with SR 29 midway between Immokalee and Felda.

Route description
State Road 82 begins in Downtown Fort Myers at US 41.  Motorists continuing past the western terminus of SR 82 travel along McGregor Boulevard (SR 867). Other State Roads within a few blocks of the western terminus include SR 80 (western terminus located two blocks to the north) and SR 739-Business US 41  to the east.

Between Business US 41 (SR 739) and Interstate 75 (SR 93), SR 82 is a divided residential/commuter road.  Within the city of Fort Myers, it is known as Dr. Martin Luther King Jr. Boulevard.

After intersecting Interstate 75, it continues east and passes close to Lehigh Acres.  SR 82 intersects Daniels Parkway and Gunnery Road at a continuous-flow intersection near Lehigh Acres. As it continues east, it crosses the southwest Florida farmlands and wetlands, a part of Big Cypress Swamp and the western edge of the Everglades drainage system.  After clipping the southwest corner of Hendry County, SR 82 enters Collier County and it loses its median and becomes a two-lane agricultural road before coming to an end at State Road 29 just north of Immokalee.

History
The route was designated State Road 184 until 1945, when it was changed to State Road 82 as part of a state-wide renumbering.

Until the 1980s, SR 82 was an "interrupted" state road, for there was concurrently a Fort Lauderdale street (Davie Boulevard) with SR 82 signage.  As part of a statewide renumbering, Davie Boulevard's SR 82 signage was replaced with signs showing its current designation, SR 736.

Prior to 1991, SR 82 was known as Anderson Avenue within Fort Myers before being changed to Dr. Martin Luther King Jr. Boulevard. Anderson Avenue was named for Dr. Richard Anderson, who is believed to be the first physician to set up a practice and drug store in Fort Myers.

Much of the highway east of Lehigh Acres was upgraded and widened to a multi-lane divided highway in the late 2010s and early 2020s.  The continuous-flow intersection (CFI) at the Daniels Parkway/Gunnery Road intersection was the first CFI built in Florida, which became fully operational on July 9, 2019.

Future
The Florida Department of Transportation is planning to widen the remaining undivided two-lane segment in Collier County. 
Construction is underway to widen SR 82 to four lanes from Gator Slough Lane to the terminus at SR 29.  This project also included converting the SR 29 intersection to a roundabout.  Widening for the remaining segment from the Collier County line to Gator Slough lane is currently being designed with construction slated to begin in 2023.

Major intersections

References

External links

Florida Route Log (SR 82)

082
082
082
082
State Road 082